Arestorides argus, commonly called the eyed cowrie, is a species of sea snail, a cowry, a marine gastropod mollusk in the family Cypraeidae, the cowries.

Subspecies
Two subspecies are recognized :
Arestorides argus argus (Linnaeus, 1758)
Arestorides argus contracasta Lorenz, 2012
Arestorides argus contrastriata (Perry, 1811) : common name : pheasant cowrie: synonym of Cypraea contrastriata Perry, 1811

Description
This is a large cowry species, with specimens averaging 80mm and measuring up to 115mm. The shape of the shell is approximately cylindrical. The ground color is light to medium tan. Overlying the ground color of the dorsum are many rings of a medium brown color and varying sizes. The rings are likened to eye spots, thus the common name eyed cowry and the specific epithet argus (after Argus Panoptes, the many-eyed Greek giant). Some individuals have numerous small rings, others have fewer, larger rings; the number and size of rings especially varies between subspecies. The aperture is relatively straight, has well-developed teeth, and is flanked by two dark-brown blotches on each side (the blotches on the outer lip are sometimes small and indistinct).

Distribution
This species and its subspecies are distributed in the Indian and Pacific Oceans. Notably, it is found in the seas off Aldabra, Chagos, the Comores, Kenya, Madagascar, the Mascarene Basin, Mauritius, Mozambique, Réunion, the Seychelles, Somalia and Tanzania.

References

 Verdcourt, B. (1954). The cowries of the East African Coast (Kenya, Tanganyika, Zanzibar and Pemba). Journal of the East Africa Natural History Society 22(4) 96: 129–144, 17 pls.
 Burgess, C.M. (1970). The Living Cowries. AS Barnes and Co, Ltd. Cranbury, New Jersey
 MacDonald & Co (1979). The MacDonald Encyclopedia of Shells. MacDonald & Co. London & Sydney.

Cypraeidae
Gastropods described in 1758
Taxa named by Carl Linnaeus